Boeda Strand (June 22, 1834 - June 22, 1928) was the "Head Basket Weaver" of the Snohomish tribe. She taught basketry to the Snohomish and to other tribes. Her original baskets are now worth thousands of dollars to collectors.

Her half-brother, Sultan John, is the namesake of the town of Sultan. She married a Finnish immigrant, Edward Strand, on Dec. 14, 1877.

"At the age of 90 ... she was still paddling a canoe from [the] Olympic Peninsula across the Puget Sound to Seattle."

References

See also
List of Native American artists
Visual arts by indigenous peoples of the Americas

Native American basket weavers
1834 births
1928 deaths
Native American history of Washington (state)
American women artists
Native American women artists
Women basketweavers
People from Snohomish County, Washington
Artists from Washington (state)
19th-century Native American women
20th-century Native American women
20th-century Native Americans